Əsədabad (also, Əsədəbad, Asadabad, and Abas-Abad) is a village and municipality in the Yardymli Rayon of Azerbaijan.  It has a population of 1,137.  The municipality consists of the villages of Əsədabad and Ünəş.

References 

Populated places in Yardimli District